The 1933 Carnegie Tech Tartans football team represented the Carnegie Institute of Technology—now known as Carnegie Mellon University—as an independent during the 1933 college football season. Led by first-year head coach Howard Harpster, the Tartans compiled a record of 4–3–2.

Schedule

References

Carnegie Tech
Carnegie Mellon Tartans football seasons
Carnegie Tech Tartans football